David Jamison is an American para-alpine skier. He represented the United States at the 1984 Winter Paralympics and at the 1988 Winter Paralympics in alpine skiing.

He won the bronze medal at the Men's Slalom LW2 event in 1984 and the silver medal at the same event in 1988.

He also represented the United States at the Men's giant slalom for single-leg amputees event in disabled skiing, a demonstration sport at the 1984 Winter Olympics.

References 

Alpine skiers at the 1984 Winter Paralympics
Alpine skiers at the 1988 Winter Paralympics
American amputees
Living people
Year of birth missing (living people)
Place of birth missing (living people)
Paralympic alpine skiers of the United States
American male alpine skiers
Medalists at the 1984 Winter Paralympics
Medalists at the 1988 Winter Paralympics
Paralympic silver medalists for the United States
Paralympic bronze medalists for the United States
Paralympic medalists in alpine skiing
20th-century American people